The Howick Hornets are a rugby league club based in Howick, New Zealand. The premier team competes in Auckland Rugby League's senior competitions. The club currently competes in the top division, the Fox Memorial Trophy. The club has a historic rivalry with neighbours, the Pakuranga Jaguars, yet both clubs support each other and join forces annually, to ensure local juniors always have a team to play in. The Howick Hornets are  former Fox Memorial champions, winning the historic shield twice so far (2011 & 2019) since they announced themselves in 1st division in 2010. 
Consistently a top four 1st division club for over a decade now, has naturally seen new great rivalries emerge with clubs such as Point Chevalier, Bay Roskil Vikings, Otahuhu Leopards, and most notably the Mt Albert Lions - who Howick Hornets defeated in the dying seconds of 2019's heart stopping grand final at Mt Smart stadium.

2023 Fox Memorial qualifications round-

-4 pools of 4 teams ranked from 2021 season placings.
-top 3 teams qualify for the Fox Premiership round robin
- bottom team enters the Fox Championship.
- bottom 4 from Premiership fall back to Championship grade after round robin, creating to grades of 8 teams.
- Top 8 finals series begins in both grades from here the top two will be decided and compete in the grand final. 

Howick Hornets also now have a very strong and talented female contingent.
2023 will see Hornet ladies compete in Under 16s, under 18s and the 1st division Farrelly Photos Womens Premiership.
25 young ladies went onto post season representative honors in 2022 as well as each sides' entire coaching staff.
Goes to show that if you want to have fun, make life long friends, and even make sport a career at the same time - then the Howick Hornets are the club for you.

The Firm is Howick Hornets supporters club set up as an affordable option for fans to be financial sponsors along side the many loyal local businesses.
Please look up The Firm on Facebook and get in touch to get your 2023 membership sorted.
Plenty of good happens with your small weekly investment, especially in the junior club, and you see it all as it happens.
Want one of the best seats in Auckland grass roots sport, bar none? 
Become a member and reserve yours now

They have their website launching later in 2023 but until then you can find, follow, or contact them on Facebook or Instagram.
Go The Mighty Hornets....Up Up The Firm.

History
The Howick Rugby League Football Club was founded in 1961 with the team playing at the Howick Domain. Former New Zealand representative Cliff Johnson was the club's first chairman. The club first entered a senior team into Auckland Rugby League competitions in 1964 under coach Tommy Baxter. In 1965 Paparoa Park, the club's current home ground, was created with the help of the Howick Borough Council.

Between 1978 and 1985 the club competed in senior competitions as Eastern United, a combined team with the Pakuranga club. The team was coached by former Kiwi Murray Eade.

The club won the Sharman Cup, the second division title, in 2005 and 2009. In 2005 they defeated the Bay Roskill Vikings 20–16. In 2009 the team won the Sharman Cup by defeating the Glenora Bears 19–12 in extra time. They also won the Auckland Rugby League's 2009 Club of the Year award for the first time ever.

In 2010 the club won promotion to the Fox Memorial Trophy and finished third before losing to the Te Atatu Roosters in a semi final. This was the first time in the club's 49-year history that they had competed in the top division of the Auckland Rugby League. During the season the Hornets defeated the Mt Albert Lions for the first time in three decades and defeated the Otahuhu Leopards for the first time in the club's history. They also hosted a Māori Television broadcast from Paparoa Park for the first time. Six players from the Hornets were named in the Counties Manukau representative team to compete in the Albert Baskerville Trophy.

In 2011 the Hornets won the Fox Memorial, defeating the Otahuhu Leopards 24–14 in the Grand Final.

Notable players
Players who have played for the club include Paul Atkins, Zeb Luisi, Anthony Gelling, Samuel Brunton, Luke Laban and Isaac John.

Howick Senior Team Records (2022)
The season record for the most senior men's team in the club.

References

External links
Official Club site
Official ARL Site
Howick Hornets Open Age Restricted Blog

 
Rugby clubs established in 1961